"Early Autumn" (1949) is a song composed by Ralph Burns and Woody Herman with lyrics by Johnny Mercer. The song grew out of the fourth segment of Burns' “Summer Sequence” concert piece and was originally recorded by the Herman band on December 27, 1947 with an outstanding eight-bar solo by saxophonist Stan Getz. Herman asked Johnny Mercer to write lyrics in 1952 and he re-recorded the song taking the vocal duties himself.

Personnel on the 1947 recording were 
 Trumpet: Stan Fishelson, Bernie Glow, Marky Markowitz, Ernie Royal, Shorty Rogers 
 Trombone: Earl Swope, Ollie Wilson, Bob Swift
 Clarinet & Alto Sax: Woody Herman
 Clarinet: Jimmy Giuffre
 Alto Sax: Sam Marowitz
 Alto Sax, Tenor Sax: Herbie Steward
 Tenor Sax: Stan Getz, Zoot Sims
 Baritone Sax: Serge Chaloff (bs) 
 Piano: Ralph Burns
 Guitar: Gene Sargent
 Bass: Walt Yoder
 Drums: Don Lamond

Charted versions were by Woody Herman and by Jo Stafford, both in 1952.

Notable recordings

Woody Herman - an instrumental version (1949).
Woody Herman - a single release in 1952 for the Mars label (catalog No. 300).
Ted Heath and His Music, vocal by Lita Roza (1952).
Jo Stafford - a single release in 1952.
Ella Fitzgerald – a single release for Decca Records (catalog No. 29810) in 1956 (recorded in 1952)
Ella Fitzgerald – new version for her album Ella Fitzgerald Sings the Johnny Mercer Songbook (1964)
Johnny Mathis – Wonderful, Wonderful (1957)
Anita O'Day - Anita O'Day Sings the Winners (1958)
Stan Getz – Stan Getz & Strings (1961)
Cleo Laine - I Am a Song (RCA Victor, 1973)
Anita Kerr Singers – Round Midnight (1975)
Patricia Barber - Split (1989)
Mel Tormé – Night at the Concord Pavilion (1990)
Diana Krall - included on the Mark Whitfield album Forever Love (1997).
The Four Freshmen – In Session (2005).
Patti LuPone – The Lady with the Torch (2006).

References

External links
"Early Autumn" at Jazz Standards

1940s jazz standards
1949 songs
Songs with music by Ralph Burns
Songs with music by Woody Herman
Songs with lyrics by Johnny Mercer
Johnny Mathis songs
Jo Stafford songs
Ella Fitzgerald songs
Grammy Hall of Fame Award recipients